The Church of the Holy Name of Jesus (Church of the Gesù) is the mother church of the Society of Jesus (Jesuits). 

Church of the Holy Name of Jesus or Holy Name of Jesus Church may also refer to:

United Kingdom
 Church of the Holy Name of Jesus, Manchester, a Grade I listed building in England

United States
 Holy Name of Jesus Church (San Francisco), a parish of the Archdiocese of San Francisco, California
 Holy Name of Jesus Parish (Stamford, Connecticut), a church in Stamford, Connecticut
 Holy Name of Jesus Church (Stratford, Connecticut), a church in Stratford, Connecticut
 Holy Name of Jesus Catholic Church (Indialantic, Florida), a Roman Catholic parish 
 Holy Name of Jesus Roman Catholic Church (Manhattan), a church in New York City